The 1874 Chicago White Stockings season was the 3rd season of the Chicago White Stockings franchise, the 2nd in the National Association of Professional Base Ball Players and the 1st at 23rd Street Grounds. The White Stockings returned to the league in 1874 after taking two years to recover from the chaos of the Great Chicago Fire. They opened their season on Wednesday May 13 hosting the Philadelphia Athletics and shut them out 4 to 0. They finished fifth in the National Association with a record of 28–31.

Regular season

Season standings

Record vs. opponents

Roster

Player stats

Batting 
Note: G = Games played; AB = At bats; H = Hits; Avg. = Batting average; HR = Home runs; RBI = Runs batted in

Starting pitchers 
Note: G = Games pitched; IP = Innings pitched; W = Wins; L = Losses; ERA = Earned run average; SO = Strikeouts

Relief pitchers 
Note: G = Games pitched; W = Wins; L = Losses; SV = Saves; ERA = Earned run average; SO = Strikeouts

References 
1874 Chicago White Stockings season at Baseball Reference

Chicago Cubs seasons
Chicago White Stockings Season, 1874
Chicago Cubs